"You're My Jamaica" is a song written by Kent Robbins, and recorded by American country music artist Charley Pride.  It was released in July 1979 as the first single and title track from the album You're My Jamaica.  The song was Pride's twenty-second number one country hit.  The single stayed at number one for one week and spent a total of ten weeks on the country chart.

Cover versions
 Pride re-recorded the song as a duet with Neal McCoy on McCoy's 2005 album That's Life.

Charts

Weekly charts

Year-end charts

References

1979 singles
Charley Pride songs
Neal McCoy songs
Songs written by Kent Robbins
RCA Records singles
1979 songs
Songs about Jamaica